Lechenaultia divaricata, commonly known as tangled leschenaultia, wirenetting bush or wirebush, is a species of flowering plant in the family Goodeniaceae and is endemic to arid and semi-arid areas of central Australia.

Description

Taxonomy
Lechenaultia divaricata was first formally described in 1862 by Ferdinand von Mueller in Fragmenta Phytographiae Australiae from specimens collected near Coopers Creek. The specific epithet (divaricata) means "widely-spreading".

Distribution and habitat
Tangled leschenaultia grows in sand, often on sand dunes in mulga scrub and woodland in arid and semi-arid areas of inland South Australia, the Northern Territory, Queensland and New South Wales.

References

divaricata
Plants described in 1862
Taxa named by Ferdinand von Mueller
Flora of South Australia
Flora of the Northern Territory
Flora of Queensland
Flora of New South Wales